The Brave Raj Stakes is an American Thoroughbred horse race run annually in late September at Calder Race Course in Miami Gardens, Florida. Open to two-year-old fillies, it is raced over a distance of one mile and seventy yards. The race currently offers a purse of $90,000 and the winner often will run in the Breeders' Cup Juvenile Fillies.

First run in 1975, the race was previously known as the Gardenia Stakes until 1996 when it became the  Jack Smallwood Stakes for 1997 and 1998. It was renamed the Brave Raj Breeders' Cup Stakes in 1999 to honor Brave Raj, the 1996 American Champion Two-Year-Old Filly who won the Breeders' Cup Juvenile Fillies. 

Silk Ridge set a new stakes record in winning the 2007 race.

Winners since 2001

References
 2007 Brave Raj Breeders' cup stakes at ESPN

Ungraded stakes races in the United States
Flat horse races for two-year-old fillies
Recurring events established in 1975
Calder Race Course